Dominik Sadzawicki (born 19 April 1994) is a Polish professional footballer who plays as a right-back for Polish IV liga club Mazovia Mińsk Mazowiecki.

External links

References

1994 births
Footballers from Poznań
Living people
Polish footballers
Poland youth international footballers
Association football defenders
GKS Katowice players
Górnik Zabrze players
Stal Mielec players
Bruk-Bet Termalica Nieciecza players
Stal Rzeszów players
MKP Pogoń Siedlce players
Kotwica Kołobrzeg footballers
Ekstraklasa players
I liga players
II liga players
III liga players